Kiril Antonenko (born February 14, 1991) is a Ukrainian footballer who plays with Toronto Falcons in the Canadian Soccer League.

Club career

Ukraine 
Antonenko was a product of Metalurh Zaporizhya academy program.

He would join the professional ranks in 2008 in the Ukrainian Second League with Tytan Armyansk. The following season he assisted the team in securing promotion to the Ukrainian First League by winning the league. After two seasons with Tytan, he remained in the third tier by signing with Hirnyk-Sport Horishni Plavni. 

In 2011, he secured a deal with Dynamo Khmelnytskyi. In total, he played in one match for Dynamo. After a brief absence, he returned to the third tier to play with Enerhiya Nova Kakhovka. In his debut season with Enerhiya, he appeared in 11 matches.

Canada 
In 2017, he went abroad to play in the Canadian Soccer League with FC Ukraine United. He would record a hattrick for the club on June 11, 2017, against Brantford Galaxy II. In his debut season with Ukraine United, he helped the club achieve a perfect season by initially clinching the Second Division title. He also assisted the club in securing the CSL II Championship by defeating Burlington SC. 

The following season he played with league rivals FC Vorkuta II. He secured another divisional title with the club and secured a playoff berth. In the opening round of the postseason, he recorded a goal against Brantford Galaxy II in a 3-1 victory. Vorkuta would win the second-division championship against Halton United.

In 2022, he returned to the CSL to play with the expansion franchise Toronto Falcons.

References 

1991 births
Living people
Ukrainian footballers
FC Metalurh Zaporizhzhia players
FC Tytan Armyansk players
FC Hirnyk-Sport Horishni Plavni players
FC Dynamo Khmelnytskyi players
FC Enerhiya Nova Kakhovka players
FC Ukraine United players
FC Continentals players
Ukrainian Premier League players
Canadian Soccer League (1998–present) players
Association football forwards
Ukrainian First League players
Ukrainian Second League players